Gable Peaks is a remote  double summit mountain located in Flathead County of the U.S. state of Montana.

Description

Gable Peaks is located at the north end of the Trilobite Range, which is a subset of the Flathead Range. It is situated on the common boundary shared by Great Bear Wilderness and the Bob Marshall Wilderness, on land managed by Flathead National Forest. The 7,700-foot north peak and 7,698-foot south peak are 0.35 mile apart. The nearest higher neighbor is Cruiser Mountain,  to the south-southeast.

Climate

Based on the Köppen climate classification, Gable Peaks is located in a subarctic climate zone characterized by long, usually very cold winters, and short, cool to mild summers. Winter temperatures can drop below −10 °F with wind chill factors below −30 °F.

Geology

Gable Peaks is composed of sedimentary rock laid down during the Precambrian to Jurassic periods.

Gallery

See also
 Geology of the Rocky Mountains

References

External links
 Weather: Gable Peaks

Mountains of Flathead County, Montana
Mountains of Montana
North American 2000 m summits
Flathead National Forest